Gadsden is a census-designated place in Richland County, South Carolina, United States. The population was 1,632 at the 2010 census. It is part of the Columbia, South Carolina metropolitan area.

History
The John J. Kaminer House, Magnolia, Oakwood, and Richland Presbyterian Church are listed on the National Register of Historic Places.

Geography
Gadsden is located at latitude 33.846 North and longitude 80.766 West. The community is located at the intersection of state highways 48 and 769.

Demographics

2020 census

As of the 2020 United States census, there were 1,301 people, 546 households, and 425 families residing in the Town.

References

Columbia metropolitan area (South Carolina)
Towns in Richland County, South Carolina
Towns in South Carolina